Anthems: The Tour was the debut headlining concert tour by English stage actress and singer Kerry Ellis with Queen guitarist Brian May. The tour, comprising 16 dates in Great Britain, supported her debut album Anthems. Beginning with two charity performances, titled Anthems: The Concert, on 1 May 2011 at the Royal Albert Hall, the tour followed commenced on 3 May 2011 and ended on 16 July 2011 with a special titled Anthems in the Park at RAF Cranwell. Receiving positive reviews, the tour was complimented by critics for the pairing of May's sound and Ellis' vocals.

Background 
In support her debut studio album, Ellis had stated, in early 2010, in an interview with Broadway.com that she planned "to have a tour to promote" Anthems. In November of that year, she announced on Twitter that the plans for a tour are to go ahead with details to follow. By December, the Royal Albert Hall date was announced while in January 2011, due to demand, a further Royal Albert Hall date was added.

By February, twelve dates were confirmed. A further date was confirmed as part of Anthems in the Park at RAF Cranwell. In April, another was added at London's Hampton Court Palace Festival.

Synopsis

Anthems: The Concert 
Commencing the tour at the Royal Albert Hall on 1 May 2011 for two special charity performances (benefiting Leukaemia & Lymphoma Research), Ellis (accompanied by May) was supported by the City of London Philharmonic, The West End Chorus, American performer Adam Pascal and electronic string quartet Escala. Singer-songwriter Dan Gillespie Sells (from British pop band The Feeling) joined her for a performance of "Love It When You Call".

At the start, Ellis was hidden from the audience among a group of cloak-clad dancers. She eventually emerged in a silver showgirl outfit from the group and began singing "Dangerland".

Anthems: The Tour 
Ellis performed at venues in Liverpool, Gateshead, Sheffield, Nottingham, Birmingham, Edinburgh, Glasgow, Cardiff, Manchester, Milton Keynes, Southend and Bath in the month of May. Described as "more raw" by Brian May, the tour saw Ellis accompanied by Brian May and their band (named "Anthems Ensemble").

Critical response 
The Royal Albert Hall concerts were met with much positivity in critical response. Edward Seckerson of The Independent wrote that the concert "makes [him] wonder if Kerry Ellis' renewed rock-chick status might permanently lure her away from the West End stage." Her "super-octane" and "powerhouse" talent was commended and he admitted that "the cosmic wall of May's now inimitable sound and style chimes with Ellis' searing vocals." He also wrote about his highlight, "Defying Gravity", confessing that the number is now more associated with Ellis than with Idina Menzel, the song's original performer. Andrew Clarke of East Anglian Daily Times commended Ellis' voice and breath control, writing that her voice "exploded on the concert stage" and "the power of [it] had the entire auditorium whooping with delight". In summary, Clake stated that it was "a highly ambitious and brilliantly realised show" that was "delivered with consummate skill and polish" with a crowd that "roared its approval" and Ellis "quite taken aback with the enthusiastic response."

On subject of the rest of the tour, David Burrows of Shropshire Star responded extremely positively and confessed that Ellis "had the room in the palm of her hand." Burrows named "Diamonds are Forever" as a stand-out performance and added that "the chemistry between Ellis and May is clear to see. These are two friends having the time of their lives." He also commented that while the crowd "might have come for Brian", "they stayed for Kerry – treating her to a number of richly deserved standing ovations." Andy Prothero of South Wales Argus also wrote that the pair "succeeded in blurring the boundaries between rock and theatre" although "it [was] tough to distinguish the Kerry fans from the Brian May fans". Eileen Wells of Express & Star responded in a similar way, writing that "an artistic chemistry between Ellis's stupendous voice and May's distinctive soaring guitar sound" create a "triumph" of a collaboration adding that "Ellis quickly dispelled any doubts about her ability to step into Freddie Mercury's shoes." Jonathan Geddes of The Herald responded less enthusiastically, admitting that "the set often had a karaoke feel to it", criticising it for being "significantly overdone". Geddes, however, enjoyed the acoustic segments and stated that May, Ellis' "propensity for costume changes" and the power of her voice "couldn't be faulted", naming the latter "outstanding". Ray Philp of Edinburgh Evening News also commended Ellis' talent yet wrote that "she [didn't] always fit in to proceedings".

Ellis' performance won the 2012 Whatsonstage.com Award for best Solo Performance.

Supporting acts 
Adam Pascal (Royal Albert Hall dates only)
Escala (Royal Albert Hall dates only)
Vintage Trouble (All except Royal Albert Hall, Hampton Court Palace Festival and RAF Cranwell dates)

Setlist

Tour dates 

Notes:
A  Ellis performed a matinée show (at 16:00) and an evening show (at 20:00) on this date.

Personnel 
Kerry Ellis: Vocals
Brian May: Guitar; Backing Vocals

The Band 
Stuart Morley: Keyboards
Jeff Leach: Keyboards
Jamie Humphries: Guitar
Neil Fairclough: Bass
Rufus Taylor: Drums
Kirstie Roberts: Backing Vocals
Niamh McNally: Backing Vocals

References

External links 

 of Kerry Ellis

2011 concert tours
Kerry Ellis